The Palace of the Dukes of Feria (Spanish: Palacio de los Duques de Feria) or the Castle of Zafra is a Gothic castle in Zafra, Badajoz, Spain founded in 1443. On June 3, 1931, during the Second Spanish Republic, it was declared a historical-artistic monument belonging to the National Treasury,

Paradores
Castles in Extremadura
1443 establishments in Europe
Buildings and structures completed in 1443
Buildings and structures in the Province of Badajoz
Palaces in Extremadura
Gothic palaces
Gothic architecture in Extremadura
15th-century establishments in Castile